Sati or SATI may refer to:

Entertainment
Sati (film), a 1989 Bengali film by Aparna Sen and starring Shabana Azmi
Sati (novel), a 1990 novel by Christopher Pike
Sati (singer) (born 1976), Lithuanian singer
Sati, a character in The Matrix Revolutions

Institutes
Samrat Ashok Technological Institute, a college in Vidisha, Madhya Pradesh, India
South African Translators' Institute, an association in South Africa representing translators and other language practitioners

Places
Sati (castle), a medieval fortified town near Shkodër, Albania
Hesar-e Sati, a village in Shahriar County, Tehran Province, Iran
Sati-ye Olya, a village in Ardabil Province, Iran
Sati-ye Sofla, a village in Ardabil Province, Iran
Sati-ye Vosta, a village in Ardabil Province, Iran

Religion
 Sati (Hindu goddess), Shiva's first wife, and after her death, reincarnated as Shiva's next wife, Parvati
 Sati (Buddhism), awareness or skillful attentiveness in Buddhism
 Sati (practice), an old Hindu tradition of a widow immolating herself after her husband's death, usually on her husband's funeral pyre
 Satis (goddess) or Sati, an Egyptian goddess

See also
 Sade Sati, the -year-long period of Saturn (Shani)
 Sarti, an Italian language surname
 Sat (Sanskrit), a Sanskrit word meaning the true essence of an entity, species or existence
 Satis (disambiguation)
 Satti, a tribe found in Muree, Kotli sattian, Kahuta and adjoining areas of Rawalpindi Punjab, Pakistan
 Satti (food), a common barbeque in the southern Philippines, related to but distinct from Malaysian and Indonesian satay